Storm Boy is a 2019 Australian drama family film based on the 1964 novella by Colin Thiele of the same name. The adaptation was directed by Shawn Seet and stars Geoffrey Rush and Jai Courtney. Thiele's novel was previously adapted in 1976.

Plot 
Based on the book, Storm Boy follows a young boy growing up on a largely uninhabited coastline of Southern Australia. He rescues three orphan pelicans and forms a close bond with them.

Cast 
 Geoffrey Rush as Michael "Storm Boy" Kingley
 Jai Courtney as Tom "Hideaway Tom"
 Finn Little as Storm Boy
 Trevor Jamieson as Bill "Fingerbone Bill"
 Morgan Davies as Madeline
 Erik Thomson as Malcom Downer
 David Gulpilil as The Father of Fingerbone Bill
 Simone Annan as Murujuga Lawyer
 Thibul Nettle as Police Officer (as Stinga-T)
 Luca Asta Sardelis as Smirking Schoolgirl #1
 Georgina Giessauf as Smirking Schoolgirl #2
 David John Clark as Police Senior Constable
 Chantal Contouri as Julie Sims
 Martha Lott as Pearl
 Nick Launchbury as Reporter #1
 Emma Bargery as Reporter #2
 Miraede Bhatia-Williams as Mildew
 Brendan Cooney as Police Officer
 Edward Boehm as Young Storm Boy
 Caroline Mignone as Angela
 Anna Bampton as Jenny
 Rory Walker as Murray
 Lucy Cowan as Belle
 Niraj Pandya as Office Receptionist
 Brendan Rock as Hunter #1
 James Smith as Hunter #2
 Bradley Trent Williams as Jasper Davies
 Tim Whibley as Office Worker
 Paul Blackwell as Cal Evans
 Michelle Nightingale as Mrs. Marks
 Natasha Wanganeen as Susan Franklin

Production 
Storm Boy, an Ambience Entertainment production, was shot along the Coorong and in Adelaide, South Australia in July–August 2017.  The Hudson Hornet used in the filming was supplied by a local South Australian car collector.

Release 
The film opened in theatres in Australia and New Zealand on 17 January 2019, in Poland on 19 January 2019 and in the United States on 5 April 2019.

Box office
The film was released in 320 theatres in Australia on 17 January 2019 but it grossed only $874,000 (USD) on its opening weekend. By the end of its theatrical run in Australia, it had earned a total of $3.5 million. The film also grossed just over $600,000 in Poland and New Zealand when it was released over 17–19 January 2019. The film was released in the United States & Territories on 5 April 2019 but only earned $71,000. The total box-office for Storm Boy was $4.2 million.

Critical response
The site's critics consensus reads, "Storm Boy can't quite live up to the original, but this retelling of a beloved story retains enough of its classic source material's heart to remain worth a watch." On Metacritic, the film has a weighted average score of 67 out of 100 based on 7 critics, indicating "generally favorable reviews".

Awards

Notes

References

External links 

 
 

2019 films
2010s children's drama films
Australian children's drama films
Films about birds
Films set in South Australia
Films scored by Alan John
Films directed by Shawn Seet
Films set in the 20th century
Films set in the 21st century
Films set on beaches
Films shot in Adelaide
Remakes of Australian films
Films about father–son relationships
Films based on Australian novels
Films based on children's books
Films about Aboriginal Australians
2010s English-language films
Screen Australia films